In the broadest sense, cultural resource management (CRM) is the vocation and practice of managing heritage assets, and other cultural resources such as contemporary art. It incorporates Cultural Heritage Management which is concerned with traditional and historic culture. It also delves into the material culture of archaeology. Cultural resource management encompasses current culture, including progressive and innovative culture, such as urban culture, rather than simply preserving and presenting traditional forms of culture.

However, the broad usage of the term is relatively recent and as a result it is most often used as synonymous with heritage management. In the United States, cultural resources management is not usually divorced from the heritage context. The term is, "used mostly by archaeologists and much more occasionally by architectural historians and historical architects, to refer to managing historic places of archaeological, architectural, and historical interests and considering such places in compliance with environmental and historic preservation laws."

Cultural resources include both physical assets such as archaeology, architecture, paintings and sculptures and also intangible culture such as folklore and interpretative arts, such as storytelling and drama.  Cultural resource managers are typically in charge of museums, galleries, theatres etc., especially those that emphasize culture specific to the local region or ethnic group.  Cultural tourism is a significant sector of the tourism industry.

At a national and international level, cultural resource management may be concerned with larger themes, such as languages in danger of extinction, public education, the ethos or operation of multiculturalism, and promoting access to cultural resources.  The Masterpieces of the Oral and Intangible Heritage of Humanity is an attempt by the United Nations to identify exemplars of intangible culture.

Background
Federal legislation had passed earlier in 1906 under the Antiquities Act, but it was not until the 1970s when the term “cultural resources” was coined by the National Park Service. The Archaeological and Historic Preservation Act of 1974, commonly known as the Moss-Bennett Act, helped to fuel the creation of CRM. The National Park Service defines cultural resources as being "Physical evidence or place of past human activity: site, object, landscape, structure; or a site, structure, landscape, object or natural feature of significance to a group of people traditionally associated with it."

Cultural resource management applied to heritage management

Cultural resource management in the heritage context is mainly concerned with the investigation of sites with archaeological potential, the preservation and interpretation of historic sites and artifacts, and the culture of indigenous people.  The subject developed from initiatives in rescue archaeology, sensitivities to the treatment of indigenous people, and subsequent legislation to protect cultural heritage.

Current cultural resource management laws and practices in the United States addresses the following resources:
 Historic properties (as listed or eligible for the National Register of Historic Places)
 Older properties that may have cultural value, but may or may not be eligible for the National Register
 Spiritual places
Cultural landscapes
Archaeological sites
Shipwrecks, submerged aircraft
Native American graves and cultural items
Historical documents
Archaeological and historical artifacts
Religious sites
Religious practices
Cultural use of natural resources
Folklife, tradition, and other social institutions

A significant proportion of the archaeological investigation in countries that have heritage management legislation including the United States and United Kingdom is conducted on sites under threat of development. In the US, such investigations are now done by private companies on a consulting basis, and a national organization exists to support the practice of CRM. Museums, besides being popular tourist attractions, often play roles in conservation of, and research on, threatened sites, including as repositories for collections from sites slated for destruction.

National Register eligibility
In the United States, a common Cultural Resource Management task is the implementation of a Section 106 review: CRM archaeologists determine whether federally funded projects are likely to damage or destroy archaeological sites that may be eligible for the National Register of Historic Places.  This process commonly entails one or more archaeological field surveys.

Careers in CRM
Cultural resource management features people from a wide array of disciplines. The general education of most involved in CRM includes, but is not limited to, sociology, archaeology, architectural history, cultural anthropology, social and cultural geography, and other fields in the social sciences.

In the field of cultural resource management there are many career choices. One could obtain a career with an action agency that works directly with the NEPA or even more specifically, Native American resources. There are also careers that can be found in review agencies like the Advisory Council on Historic Preservation (ACHP), or the state historic preservation office (SHPO). Beyond these choices, one could also obtain a career as part of the local government and work with planning agencies, housing agencies, social service agencies, local museums, libraries, or educational institutions. Jobs at private cultural resource management companies can range from field technicians (see shovelbum) to principal investigators, project archaeologists, historic preservationists, and laboratory work.  One could also become a part of an advocacy organization, such as the National Trust for Historic Preservation.

Debates
It is commonly debated in cultural resource management how to determine whether cultural or archaeological sites should be considered significant or not. The criteria that is stated by the National Register of Historic Places is said to be able to be “interpreted in different ways so that the significance… may be subjectively argued for many cultural resources.”  Another issue that arises among scholars is that “protection does not necessarily mean preservation.”  Any public projects occurring near the cultural resource can have adverse effects. Development plans for a proposed project may not be able to be changed to limit impact and to avoid damage to the resource.

Management of cultural organizations
The vocation of management in cultural and creative sectors is the subject of research and improvement initiatives, by organizations such as Arts and Business which take a partnership approach to involving professional business people in running and mentoring arts organizations.  Some universities now offer vocational degrees.

The management of cultural heritage is underpinned by academic research in archaeology, ethnography and history.  The broader subject is also underpinned by research in sociology and culture studies.

Anthropology

Understanding the traditional cultures of all peoples (Indigenous or not) is essential in mitigating the adverse impact of development and ensuring that intervention by more developed nations is not prejudicial to the interests of local people or results in the extinction of cultural resources.

Cultural resources policies
Cultural resources policies have developed over time with the recognition of the economic and social importance of heritage and other cultural assets.

The exploitation of cultural resources can be controversial, particularly where the finite cultural heritage resources of developing countries are exported to satisfy the demand for antiquities market in the developed world.  The exploitation of the potential intellectual property of traditional remedies in identifying candidates for new drugs has also been controversial.  On the other hand, traditional crafts can be important elements of income from tourism, performance of traditional dances, and music that is popular with tourists and traditional designs can be exploited in the fashion industry.  Popular culture can also be an important economic asset.

See also

 Centre for Cultural Resources and Training
 Committee on Education, Culture, Tourism and Human Resources
 Community art
 Cultural anthropology
 Cultural Heritage Management
 Cultural landscape
 Cultural tourism
 Valletta Treaty
Historic preservation
 Intangible culture
 Masterpieces of the Oral and Intangible Heritage of Humanity
 National Register of Historic Places
 Natural resource management
 Portal:Arts
 Public history
 Rescue archaeology
 Urban culture

References

Further reading
American Cultural Resources Association. 2013. The Cultural Resources Management Industry: Providing Critical Support for Building Our Nation’s Infrastructure through Expertise in Historic Preservation. Electronic document. 
Hutchings, Rich. 2014. “The Miner’s Canary”—What the Maritime Heritage Crisis Says About Archaeology, Cultural Resource Management, and Global Ecological Breakdown. Unpublished PhD dissertation, Interdisciplinary Studies, University of British Columbia. 
Hutchings, Rich and Marina La Salle. 2012. Five Thoughts on Commercial Archaeology. Electronic document. 
King, Thomas F. 2012. Cultural Resource Laws and Practice: An Introductory Guide (4th Edition). Altamira Press. 
King, Thomas F. 2009. Our Unprotected Heritage: Whitewashing the Destruction of Our Cultural and Natural Environment. Left Coast Press. 
King, Thomas F. 2005. Doing Archaeology: A Cultural Resource Management Perspective. Left Coast Press. 
La Salle, Marina and Rich Hutchings. 2012. Commercial Archaeology in British Columbia. The Midden 44(2): 8-16. 
Neumann, Thomas W. and Robert M. Sanford. 2010. Cultural Resources Archaeology: An Introduction (2nd Edition). Rowman and Littlefield. 
Neumann, Thomas W. and Robert M. Sanford. 2010. Practicing Archaeology: A Training Manual for Cultural Resources Archaeology (2nd Edition). Rowman and Littlefield. 
Nissley, Claudia and Thomas F. King. 2014. Consultation and Cultural Heritage: Let Us Reason Together. Left Coast Press. 
Smith, Laurajane. 2004. Archaeological Theory and Politics of Cultural Heritage. Routledge. 
Smith, Laurajane. 2001. Archaeology and the Governance of Material Culture: A Case Study from South-Eastern Australia. Norwegian Archaeological Review 34(2): 97-105. 
Smith, Laurajane. 2000. A History of Aboriginal Heritage Legislation in South-Eastern Australia. Australian Archaeology 50: 109-118. 
Stapp, Darby and Julia J. Longenecker. 2009. Avoiding Archaeological Disasters: A Risk Management Approach. Left Coast Press 
White, Gregory G. and Thomas F. King. 2007. The Archaeological Survey Manual. Left Coast Press. 
Zorzin, Nicolas. 2014. Heritage Management and Aboriginal Australians: Relations in a Global, Neoliberal Economy—A Contemporary Case Study from Victoria. Archaeologies: The Journal of the World Archaeological Congress 10(2): 132-167. 
Zorzin, Nicolas. 2011. Contextualising Contract Archaeology in Quebec: Political Economy and Economic Dependencies. Archaeological Review from Cambridge 26(1): 119-135. 
 Parga Dans, Eva and Pablo Alonso Gonzalez. 2020. The Unethical Enterprise of the Past: Lessons from the Collapse of Archaeological Heritage Management in Spain  Journal of Business Ethics.

External links
 American Cultural Resources Association

Collections care
Conservation and restoration of cultural heritage
Museology
The arts
Cultural anthropology